Notre Dame Island is an artificial island in the Saint Lawrence River in Montreal, Quebec, Canada. It is immediately to the east of Saint Helen's Island and west of the Saint Lawrence Seaway and the city of Saint-Lambert on the south shore. Together with Saint Helen's Island, it makes up Parc Jean-Drapeau, which forms part of the Hochelaga Archipelago. To the southeast, the island is connected to the embankment separating the seaway and Lachine Rapids.

Parc Jean-Drapeau is registered as a leg of the Route Verte and Trans Canada Trail.

It houses the Circuit Gilles Villeneuve, host of the Canadian Grand Prix of Formula One.

History
Notre Dame Island was built in ten months from 15 million tons of rock excavated for the Montreal Metro underground rail in 1965. It was created for Expo 67 to celebrate Canada's centennial.

Nearly all of the remaining Expo 67 pavilions were demolished in 1975 to make way for a long rowing and canoeing basin for Montreal's 1976 Summer Olympics. The Olympic Basin is still North America's largest artificial rowing basin. The former pavilion of France and the pavillon of Quebec was gutted, redecorated, and became the Montreal Casino, as a large gambling establishment owned and operated by the Government of Quebec. The Canadian Pavilion now serves the administration of the Société du parc Jean-Drapeau, a para-municipal body of the city of Montreal, manager of Parc Jean-Drapeau.

The park area on the island's southern tip has a small lake with a beach open throughout the summer for swimming, volleyball and watercraft rentals. During the decades since Expo 67, the city of Montreal has embellished the island with plants and trees, making it look less artificial.

In 1980 the greening and beautification of the island was accelerated when it was the host to the Floralies Internationales, a horticultural exhibition and competition gathering plant masterpieces from dozens of countries. The Floralies gardens are preserved and arranged creatively by the Parc Jean-Drapeau team of gardeners. In addition, the micro-climate created in part by the lagoons crisscrossing the island promotes the uniqueness of these gardens by allowing plants usually intolerant of Montreal's cold climate to grow.

The park hosted the ICF Canoe Sprint World Championships in 1986.

Off-season
In fall and spring, visitors to Notre Dame Island primarily consist of gamblers at the casino and rowers and canoers at the Olympic Basin. During the coldest part of winter, ice skaters use the basin as a rink. City workers clear the snow from its icy surface as part of the annual winter festival, "La Fête des Neiges de Montréal". However, the ice rink was located on Saint Helen's Island, close to the Jean-Drapeau metro station, the past few years. Cross-country skiers and snowshoers can also tour the area.

Circuit Gilles Villeneuve
Each summer, Notre-Dame Island's Circuit Gilles Villeneuve hosts the Formula One Canadian Grand Prix race and used to host the NAPA Auto Parts 200 of NASCAR's Nationwide Series (now known as the Xfinity Series). The circuit, opened in 1978, is accessible to the public when it is not being used for motorsports.

Gallery

See also 
 Land reclamation
 List of islands of Quebec

References
1976 Summer Olympics official report. Volume 2. pp. 112–7.
Gray, Jeremy.  Montreal. Lonely Planet, 2004. p. 50 and 59.
Frommer, Arthur. Montreal and Quebec City, 2007. p. 65.
McKay, Emma ed. Montreal and Quebec City. Colour guide, 2005. p. 23.
 Ulysses Travel Guides.  pp. 189–190

External links
 Parc Jean-Drapeau (official website)
 Notre Dame Island at Expo 67

Notre-Dame, Ile
Notre-Dame, Ile
Venues of the 1976 Summer Olympics
Olympic canoeing venues
Olympic rowing venues
Expo 67
Landforms of Montreal
Parc Jean-Drapeau
River islands of Quebec
Islands of the Saint Lawrence River
1965 establishments in Canada